Jean Feyte (21 October 1903 – 4 January 1996) was a French film editor.

Selected filmography
 Suzanne (1932)
 Jeanne (1934)
 Princesse Tam-Tam (1935)
 Merchant of Love (1935)
 Return to Paradise (1935)
 The Phantom Wagon (1939)
 Three from St Cyr (1939)
 Happy Days (1941)
 The Benefactor (1942)
 The Phantom Baron (1943)
 Arlette and Love (1943)
 The Count of Monte Cristo (1943)
 Traveling Light (1944)
 Les Dames du Bois de Boulogne (1945)
 La Fiancée des ténèbres (1945)
 Gates of the Night (1946)
 Monsieur Vincent (1947)
 Operation Swallow (1948)
 Mission in Tangier (1949)
 Millionaires for One Day (1949)
 Suzanne and the Robbers (1949)
 A Certain Mister (1950)
 Beware of Blondes (1950)
 My Wife Is Formidable (1951)
 Two Pennies Worth of Violets (1951)
 Darling Caroline  (1951)
 Mister Taxi (1952)
 The Girl with the Whip (1952)
 Crimson Curtain (1952)
 My Husband Is Marvelous (1952)
 The Three Musketeers (1953)
 La môme vert-de-gris (1953)
 Cadet Rousselle (1954)
 The Women Couldn't Care Less (1954)
 I'll Get Back to Kandara (1956)
 Mannequins of Paris (1956)
 Le Bossu (1959)
 Captain Blood (1960)
 The Seven Deadly Sins (1962)
 Méfiez-vous, mesdames (1963)
 Panic in Bangkok (1964)
 The Troops of St. Tropez (1964)
 The Diabolical Dr. Z (1965)

References

Bibliography
 James S. Williams. Jean Cocteau. Manchester University Press, 2006.

External links

1903 births
1996 deaths
French film editors
Mass media people from Marseille